Kauan is an atmospheric doom metal/post-rock band from Chelyabinsk, Russia formed in 2005.

Kauan's name stems from the Finnish language, meaning for a long time, and many of the band's lyrics are in Finnish. Furthermore, most of the band now lives in Estonia.

History
Kauan was formed by Anton Belov (formerly of Helengard and Inea) in February 2005. At the beginning, their sound was a blend of folk metal, black metal and doom metal.

In September 2006, Lyubov Mushnikova joined the band on violin. Guitarist Alexander Borovikh joined prior to the recording of their debut album, Lumikuuro, released 4 August 2007 by BadMoodMan Music.

Borovikh left the band prior to the recording of their second album, Tietäjän laulu, which was released by BadMoodMan Music on 30 November 2008. The album incorporated ambient and post-rock elements.

Kauan released their third album, Aava tuulen maa, on 18 November 2009 on Firebox Records/BadMoodMan Music. By that point, the band's genre had evolved to a melancholic mixture of atmospheric neofolk and post-rock.

In 2010, Belov and his wife, vocalist Alina "Witch_A" Belova (formerly of Inferno and Semargl), released a full-length album on Firebox Records with his other project Helengard.

On 26 June 2011, Kauan's fourth album, Kuu.., was released by Avantgarde Music. The album featured a strong post-rock/ambient sound with elements of doom metal. Mushnikova left the band later in 2011.

Belov assembled a full band lineup in 2013, including Belova as keyboardist as well as bassist Alex Vynogradoff (also of Vin De Mia Trix), viola player Anatoly Gavrylov and drummer Anton Skrynnik (ex-Dimicandum). This lineup performed on Kauan's fifth album, Pirut, released by Blood Music on 15 December 2013. That same year, the band self-released a digital compilation box set, Private Release, reissued in part in 2014 as Muistumia by Blood Music.

The next Kauan studio album, Sorni Nai, was streamed on 15 October 2015, and released on 20 October. A concept album consisting of one continuous song sectioned as seven tracks, it explored the mysterious 1959 Dyatlov Pass incident.

The band's seventh studio album, Kaiho, was released 22 September 2017. It featured vocals by Finnish folk singer Marja Mattlar.

Kauan's eighth studio album, Ice Fleet, was released on 9 April 2021.

Other projects
In 2016, Belov announced that he had also joined as a member of Vynogradoff's project A Noend of Mine.

Members

Current members
Anton Belov – composer, vocals , guitar, keyboards, programming 
Alex Vynogradoff – bass guitar, backing vocals 
Alina Belova – keyboards, backing vocals 
Anatoly Gavrylov – viola 
Anton Skrynnik – drums

Former members
Alexander Borovikh – guitar, backing vocals 
Lyubov Mushnikova – violin

Session members
Igor Andrievskiy - violin  
Maxim Rymar - cello  
Vladimir Babutin - cello  
Artur Andriasyan - keyboards, backing vocals  
Astaroth Merc - lead guitar

Discography

Studio albums
Lumikuuro (2007, BadMoodMan Music)
Tietäjän laulu (2008, BadMoodMan Music)
Aava tuulen maa (2009, Firebox Records/BadMoodMan Music)
Kuu.. (2011, Avantgarde Music)
Pirut (2013, Blood Music)
Sorni Nai (2015, Blood Music)
Kaiho (2017, self-released)
Ice Fleet (2021, Artoffact Records)

Compilation albums
Private Release digital box set (2013, self-released) 
Muistumia (2014, Blood Music)

Selected compilation appearances
"Vmesto Slez" on Der Wanderer über dem Nebelmeer (2010, Pest Productions)

References

External links
 Facebook page
 Myspace page

Russian folk metal musical groups
Doom metal musical groups
Russian post-rock groups
Ambient music groups
Musical groups established in 2005